Malaysia competed in the 1987 Southeast Asian Games held in Jakarta, Indonesia from 9 to 20 December 1987.

Medal summary

Medals by sport

Medallists

Football

Men's tournament
Group A 

Semifinal

Gold medal match

References

1987
Nations at the 1987 Southeast Asian Games
1987 in Malaysian sport